Soekardjo Wirjopranoto (June 5, 1903 - October 23, 1962) was an Indonesian freedom fighter and National Hero of Indonesia.

In 1923, he was a graduate of the Law School in the District Court. Then, he worked in several cities until finally set up his own law office "Vishnu" in Malang, East Java.

Sukardjo become a member of the Volksraad in 1931. Additionally with Dr. Sutomo founded the National Association of Indonesia.

He also served as Indonesia's Permanent Representative at the United Nations (UN) until the end.

He was buried in Kalibata Heroes Cemetery, Jakarta.

1903 births
1962 deaths
Ambassadors of Indonesia to China
Indonesian collaborators with Imperial Japan
Members of the Central Advisory Council
National Heroes of Indonesia
People from Cilacap Regency